John Greco (born April 24, 1961) is the Robert L. McDevitt and Catherine H. McDevitt Professor of Philosophy at Georgetown University. Before coming to Georgetown, Greco taught at Saint Louis University. 

Greco received his A.B. from Georgetown University in 1983 and completed his Ph.D. at Brown University in 1989 under Ernest Sosa. His research interests are in epistemology and metaphysics and he has published widely on virtue epistemology, epistemic normativity, skepticism, and Thomas Reid. From 2013 until 2020, he was the Editor of American Philosophical Quarterly. For 2013–15, together with Eleonore Stump, he held a $3.3 million grant from the John Templeton Foundation for a project on intellectual humility.

References

1961 births
Living people
Epistemologists
American philosophers
Catholic philosophers
Brown University alumni
Saint Louis University faculty
Fordham University faculty
Georgetown University faculty